John A. Slagle (November 1869 – February 19, 1915) was an American pitcher in Major League Baseball. He pitched one game, 1 scoreless innings, being credited with a save, for the Cincinnati Kelly's Killers of the American Association on April 30, 1891. After his brief major league appearance, Slagle pitched through 1896 in the minor leagues.

References

1869 births
1915 deaths
19th-century baseball players
Major League Baseball pitchers
Cincinnati Kelly's Killers players
Oshkosh Indians players
Montgomery Colts players
Easton Dutchmen players
Jacksonville Jacks players
Buffalo Bisons (minor league) players
St. Joseph Saints players
Grand Rapids Rippers players
Grand Rapids Gold Bugs players
Cedar Rapids Bunnies players
Galesburg (minor league baseball) players
Baseball players from Indiana